João Oliveira (born 31 July 1995) is a Portuguese male volleyball player. He is part of the Portugal men's national volleyball team.

References

External links
 Benfica official profile 
 Profile at FIVB.org

1995 births
Living people
Portuguese men's volleyball players
S.L. Benfica volleyball players
Place of birth missing (living people)